Ectyonopsis pluridentata, the fused branch sponge, is a species of demosponge from South Africa.

Description 
The fused branch sponge is made up of a thick cluster of fused branches arising from an indistinct base. It is beige to rusty brown in colour. The surface is rough and is covered in small (<) circular ostia. While it is firm and compressible, it also breaks easily.

Distribution and habitat 
This species is endemic to South Africa.

References 

Poecilosclerida
Species described in 1963
Biodiversity of South Africa